James Thomas Patterson (October 20, 1908 – February 7, 1989) was a U.S. Representative from Connecticut.

Born in Naugatuck, Connecticut, Patterson attended the public schools.
He was graduated from Peekskill (New York) Military Academy in 1929 and from Georgetown University, Washington, D.C., in 1933.
He was in the University of Miami, Coral Gables, Florida, B.A., in 1934, and from National University Law School (now George Washington University), LL.B., Washington, D.C., 1939.
While attending school worked for the Connecticut highway department from 1924 to 1933, U.S. Rubber Company in 1934, for the United States Department of Labor 1934–1937, for the Social Security Board in 1937 and 1938, and for the United States Treasury 1938–1940.
He served with the United States Marine Corps and the Office of Strategic Services from September 1941 until discharged as a major in July 1946, with overseas service in the African and European Theaters and in India, Burma, and China.

Patterson was elected as a Republican to the Eightieth and to the five succeeding Congresses (January 3, 1947 – January 3, 1959). Patterson voted in favor of the Civil Rights Act of 1957. He was an unsuccessful candidate for reelection in 1958 to the Eighty-sixth Congress, for election in 1960 to the Eighty-seventh Congress, and in 1970 to the Ninety-second Congress.
He was a resident of Bethlehem, Connecticut, until his death in Camden, New Jersey, on February 7, 1989.

References

External links

1908 births
1989 deaths
Patterson, James T.
National University School of Law alumni
University of Miami alumni
United States Marine Corps officers
People of the Office of Strategic Services
Republican Party members of the United States House of Representatives from Connecticut
20th-century American politicians
People from Naugatuck, Connecticut
People from Bethlehem, Connecticut
Military personnel from Connecticut